An atomic fountain is a cloud of atoms that is tossed upwards in the Earth's gravitational field by lasers.  If it were visible, it would resemble the water in a fountain.  While weightless in the toss, the atoms are measured to set the frequency of an atomic clock.

The primary motivation behind the development of the atomic fountain derives from the Ramsey method of measuring the frequency of atomic transitions. In broad strokes, the Ramsey method involves exposing a cloud of atoms to a brief radiofrequency (rf) electromagnetic field; waiting a time T; briefly exposing the cloud to the rf field again; and then measuring what fraction of the atoms in the cloud have transitioned. If the frequency of the rf field is identical to the atomic transition frequency, 100% of the atoms will have transitioned; if the frequency of the field differs slightly from the transition frequency, some of the atoms will not have transitioned. By repeatedly sending clouds of atoms through such an apparatus, the frequency of the field can be adjusted to match the atomic transition frequency.

The precision of the Ramsey method can be increased by increasing the wait time T of the cloud. The use of an atomic fountain with a cooled atomic cloud allows for wait times on the order of one second, which is vastly greater than what can be achieved by performing the Ramsey method on a hot atomic beam. This is one reason why NIST-F1, a caesium fountain clock, can keep time more precisely than NIST-7, a caesium beam clock.

History

The idea of the atomic fountain was first proposed in the 1950s by Jerrold Zacharias. Zacharias attempted to implement an atomic fountain using a thermal beam of atoms, under the assumption that the atoms at the low-velocity end of the Maxwell–Boltzmann distribution would be of sufficiently low energy to execute a reasonably sized parabolic trajectory. However, the attempt was not successful because fast atoms in a thermal beam struck the low-velocity atoms and scattered them.

References

Atoms
Atomic physics
Atomic clocks
Nuclear technology